The Swedish Club of Chicago is a historic building located in Chicago, Illinois. During the late 19th century the Swedish Club was an important center for the Swedish American immigrant community in Chicago, in a neighborhood that was known then as Swede Town.

References

Clubhouses on the National Register of Historic Places in Chicago
Cultural infrastructure completed in 1870
Swedish-American culture in Chicago
Swedish-American history